Seychelles competed in the Olympic Games for the first time at the 1980 Summer Olympics in Moscow, USSR.

Athletics

Nine athletes represented Seychelles in 1980.

Men's 100 metres
 Marc Larose
 Heat — 10.62 (→ did not advance)

Men's 200 metres
 Casimir Pereira
 Heat — 21.29 (→ next round)

Men's 400 metres
 Régis Tranquille
 Heat — 49.34 (→ did not advance)

Men's Marathon
 Albert Marie
 Final — did not finish (→ no ranking)

Men's 110 m Hurdles
 Antonio Gopal
 Heat — 16.36 (→ did not advance)

Men's 3,000 m Steeplechase
 Albert Marie
 Heat — 9:19.7 (→ did not advance)

Men's 4 × 100 metres Relay
 Marc La Rose, Regis Tranquille, Casimir Pereira and Vincent Confait
 Heat — 41.71 (→ did not advance)

Men's 4 × 400 metres Relay
 Vincent Confait, Regis Tranquille, Marc La Rose and Casimir Pereira 
 Heat — 3:19.2 (→ did not advance)

Men's Triple Jump
Arthure Agathine
 Qualification — 14.21 m (→ did not advance, 20th place out of 23)

Women's 100 metres
 Bessey de Létourdie
 Heat — 13.04 (→ did not advance)

Women's 200 metres
 Bessey de Létourdie
 Heat — 26.91 (→ did not advance)

Women's 800 metres
 Margaret Morel
 Heat — 2:17.0 (→ did not advance)

Women's 1,500 metres
 Margaret Morel
 Heat — 4:37.9 (→ did not advance)

Boxing

Two boxers represented Seychelles in 1980.

Men's Featherweight (57 kg)
 Ramy Zialor
 First Round — Bye
 Second Round — Lost to Leoul Nearaio (Ethiopia) on points (2-3)

Men's Welterweight (67 kg)
 Michael Pillay
 First Round — Defeated Ole Svendsen (Denmark) on points (4-1)
 Second Round — Lost to Mehmet Bogujevci (Yugoslavia) on knock-out in first round

References
Official Olympic Reports

Nations at the 1980 Summer Olympics
1980
1980 in Seychelles